
Ch'alla Quta (Aymara ch'alla sand, quta lake, "sand lake", also spelled Challa Kota) is a lake in the Cordillera Real in the Andes of Bolivia. It is situated in the La Paz Department, Larecaja Province, Sorata Municipality. Ch'alla Quta lies south of the mountain Larama Punta.

References 

Lakes of La Paz Department (Bolivia)